Tsengel (bright; , white-Sayan) is a sum (district) of Bayan-Ölgii Province in western Mongolia. The capital (sum center) of Tsengel is Khushoot, located in the west of the sum.

The inhabitants are mainly Tuvans, known as  Tsengel Tuvans, whereas the rest of Bayan-Ölgii is populated mainly by  Kazakhs. As of 2014 it had a population of 8744 people.

References

External links
 Review of Hearing Birds Fly: A Nomadic Year in Mongolia, a book by Louisa Waugh, who spent a year there

Populated places in Mongolia
Districts of Bayan-Ölgii Province